Henri Kanninen (born October 17, 1994) is a Finnish ice hockey player who plays as a centre for JYP Jyväskylä.

References

Living people
JYP Jyväskylä players
Finnish ice hockey centres
1994 births
Sportspeople from Jyväskylä
21st-century Finnish people